Seductio is a 1987 Canadian film written, produced, and directed by Bashar Shbib. The film stars Attila Bertalan and Kathy Horner as Mikael and Melanie, a couple who are lost in the woods when their vehicle breaks down while travelling; Melanie is consumed by a fear of being attacked by bears, while Mikael tries to stoke her fears as a psychological game.

Distribution
The film premiered in the Panorama Canada stream at the Montreal World Film Festival on August 29, 1987. It later faced some controversy when the Rendez-vous Québec Cinéma initially refused to screen the film in its original form at its 1988 festival; Chbib attempted to blockade the venue in protest. When the film screened at the 1987 Toronto International Film Festival, Chbib also stripped in public to protest the lack of funding available to independent filmmakers.

Critical response
The film was poorly received by critics. Jay Scott of The Globe and Mail opined that the film had been programmed by TIFF solely "to remind viewers how bad Canadian movies once were", and concluded that "you can escape the theatre, but you can't collect on the debt Seductio owes you for wasted time". John Harkness of Now wrote that publicist Daphna Kastner deserved an award for having to promote the film, and felt personally compelled to ask festival programmer Kay Armatage why the festival even programmed Chbib's films at all.

References

External links 
 

1987 films
English-language Canadian films
1987 comedy-drama films
Films directed by Bashar Shbib
1987 comedy films
1987 drama films
Canadian comedy-drama films
1980s English-language films
1980s Canadian films